Latgah (also Romanized as Latgāh; also known as Labtgāh, Latgā’, Latjāh, and Les̄gā’) is a village in Mohajeran Rural District, Lalejin District, Bahar County, Hamadan Province, Iran. At the 2006 census, its population was 1,973, in 535 families.

References 

Populated places in Bahar County